Héliopolis is a district in Guelma Province, Algeria. It was named after its capital, Héliopolis.

Municipalities
The district is further divided into 3 municipalities, which is the highest number in the province:
Héliopolis
El Fedjoudj 
Bouati Mahmoud

References

 
Districts of Guelma Province